The 2023 Hankook Dubai 24 Hour will be the 18th running of the Dubai 24 Hour, an endurance race that takes place at the Dubai Autodrome on 14 and 15 January 2023. It is also the first round of the 2023 24H GT Series and TCE Series.

Schedule

Entry list
53 cars are entered into the event: 47 GT cars and 6 TCEs.

Results

Qualifying
Pole positions in each class are denoted in bold.

GT
Fastest in class in bold.

Notes 
The following cars received a drop of start grid positions as a result of Race Director decisions:
  Car 7 – 2 positions
  Car 961 – 3 positions
  Car 962 – 3 positions
  Car 977 – 5 positions
  Car 988 – 5 positions

TCE
Fastest in class in bold.

Race
Class winner in bold.

Notes

References

External links

Dubai 24 Hour
Dubai
Dubai
Dubai